The angular roughshark (Oxynotus centrina) is a rough shark of the family Oxynotidae.

Taxonomy 

Biologist Carl Linnaeus described the angular roughshark, O. centrina, in 1758. This name was later finalized and accepted by the scientific community as the official name for the species in 1976.

Description 

Their litter size is  seven or eight pups off Angola to 23 in the Mediterranean. They have ridges over their eyes that expand into large, rounded knobs, which are covered with enlarged denticles – these are absent in other species of rough sharks. They possess very large spiracles that are vertically elongated, being almost as high as the length of their eyes. Their first dorsal spine is oriented slightly forward. They feed on worms, crustaceans, and mollusks.

Oxynotus centrina has a compressed body, triangular in cross section, with a broad and flattened head. The snout is flat and blunt. Just like all of the Oxynotus species, they have two relatively large dorsal fins that are sail-like, and no anal fin. Their color scheme is grey or grey-brown dorsally with dark blotched on its head and sides. However, one identifying feature is the light horizontal line below the eyes on the cheek.

Since it shares the northeast Atlantic with another species of Oxynotus, other distinguishing features include the extremely large spiracles, their dorsal fins, and their large dermal denticles above their eyes. Like most of the Oxynotus species, O. centrina has lanceolate upper teeth and blade-like lower teeth, with 12 rows of teeth on either side.

Oxynotus centrina usually moves by gliding on the bottom of the sea, sometimes hovering over the sandy or muddy surfaces of the seabed.

Range and habitat 

They occur in the eastern Atlantic from Norway to South Africa, including the entire Mediterranean. They may also occur off Mozambique.

Reproduction 

Male and female angular roughsharks are reported to mature at about 50–70 cm. Although, some studies have shown that females mature at a slightly larger size than males. Being an ovoviviparous species, O. centrina produces 10-12 pups usually between 21 and 24 cm in length.

Population 

Some data has been gathered on this species of Oxynotus in the period from 1994 to 1999 in the Mediterranean.  O. centrina was only present in 0.6% of the tows during this period at a depth of 100 to 200 m.   Regional indexes indicate this species is more common in the western central Mediterranean and lower index in the western and eastern Mediterranean. However, O. centrina was completely absent from the Eastern central Mediterranean.

In 1948, trawl surveys indicated that O. centrina was once present, but uncommon, in the Adriatic. Although, the species has been absent in subsequent studies in the Adriatic, suggesting a possible extinction of that species in the area. However, recent studies, done by Lipej in 2004, show that some juveniles have been caught in the central Adriatic. Also, some data collected during the surveys in the Balearic Sea and the Ionian Sea found one specimen at 800 m in the western Ionian Sea, suggesting that the population of O. centrina, in the east-central Mediterranean, has an unknown population.

However, this species was absent in the northeast Atlantic in a study of deepwater longline fishing for sharks near the Canary Islands. This is important because this species was abundant in this region until 1997.

Conservation status 

Oxynotus centrina is a minor bycatch of offshore fisheries such as trawl fleets. Although this can have a negative impact on the species, as stated above, the species had been thought extinct in the Adriatic, decreased fishing has led to their rediscovery.

This species, sometimes caught by fishermen in the Mediterranean, has little to no commercial value. Also, it is thought to bring bad luck to fishermen if caught and kept. When released, it has never been reported to survive.

The IUCN Red List of Threatened Species has deemed this species of Oxynotus as endangered due to consistent landings by fishermen and bycatch by deepsea fisheries.

References 

angular roughshark
Marine fish of Europe
Fish of the Mediterranean Sea
Fish of the Black Sea
Marine fauna of West Africa
angular roughshark
angular roughshark